Eva Björk Davíðsdóttir (born 30 June 1994) is an Icelandic handball player for Stjarnan and the Icelandic national team.

She has previously played for the Danish League club Ajax København until 2019.

References 

Eva Bjork Davidsdottir
1994 births
Living people
Grótta women's handball players